Oberholser is a German surname. Notable people with the surname include:

Arron Oberholser (born 1975), American golfer and television commentator 
Harry C. Oberholser (1870–1963), American ornithologist

German-language surnames